In the days of printing with metal type sorts, it was common to rotate letters and digits 180° to create new symbols. This was done for example with the Palaeotype alphabet, the International Phonetic Alphabet, the Fraser script, and for some mathematical symbols. Perhaps the earliest instance of this that is still in use was turned e for schwa.

In the eighteenth-century Caslon metal fonts, the British pound sign (£) was set with a rotated italic uppercase J.

Unicode support
The following rotated (turned) letters have Unicode codepoints unless otherwise indicated.

Latin
In this table, parentheses mark letters that stand in for themselves or for another. For instance, a rotated 'b' would be a 'q', and indeed some physical typefaces didn't bother with distinct sorts for those letters, while a rotated 's' would be itself. Long s with a combining dot below, can stand in for a rotated j.

 (En dash) mark small caps that would not be very distinct from the turned lower case letter, though they are possible: turned small cap c is supported,).

The Fraser script creates duplicates of all the rotated capitals, except for M, Q and W. Rotated Y was added as an additional to the script in March 2020.

The letters ⅁, ⅂, ⅄ are specified as sans-serif. Additional small cap forms are found in the literature (e.g. turned ᴀ ᴋ ʟ ᴜ), but are not supported as of Unicode 13.

Turned ɢ was added to the extIPA in 2015; it and turned ᴋ are scheduled for Unicode support in 2021.

Other rotated letters include the digraphs ᴂ and ᴔ. The "rotated" capital Q in Unicode is only turned 90 degrees: ℺.

Additional

Greek and Cyrillic
Many of the few rotated Greek letters are intended for mathematical notation. In this table, an en dash is used to mark Greek and Cyrillic letters that are not distinct from a Latin letter. Reversed L, can stand in for a rotated gamma Γ, though it is defined as sans serif.

 is close to the turned form of one variant of lower-case Б.

In some fonts, an allograph of Ʒ displays as turned Σ. 

In addition, the horseshoe  of the IPA has allographs that are a turned small-capital Ω.

Other
Other rotated symbols include ɞ (rotated or reversed ʚ), ʖ (rotated ʕ) ⱹ (rotated ɽ), ɺ (rotated ɼ), ↊ and ↋ (inverted digits 2 and 3), Ꝿ ꝿ (inverted Ᵹ ᵹ), and ⅋ (inverted &). The 'turned comma'  is, as its name suggests, a rotated comma. It is used for the Hawaiian letter okina. Spanish uses the rotated punctuation marks ¡ and ¿ (inverted ! and ?).

Reversed letters
In addition to turned letters, Unicode supports a few reversed (mirror-image) letters from the Latin alphabet (including 𝼇, Ƹ ƹ and ʕ); the Cyrillic alphabet (as well as Cyrillic И и and Я я, which are graphically equivalent to reversed Latin N ɴ and R ʀ), superscript ᶟ ᴻ, the tresillo Ꜫ ꜫ, which historically is a reversed 3, and the math symbol ∂, which historically is a reversed 6.

Current IPA ɜ is officially a reversed rather than rotated ɛ; the older rotated ᴈ is now deprecated.

Lower-case Ƌ is close to a reversed Cyrillic capital Б.

Reversed k ɡ ŋ (𝼃 𝼁 𝼇) were added to the extIPA in 2015 and are scheduled for Unicode support in 2021.

Greek and Cyrillic

Sideways
There are only a few characters that are sideways that are encoded in Unicode, but some might come in future versions.

 

A few additional characters are encoded, too. They are ᴓ, ᴒ, ᴟ, and ᴞ.

Notes

References

Typography
Unicode